OUAT Entertainment was a French studio that creates and publishes  Video games. OUAT is the acronym of Once Upon A Time, the logo of the company represent the symbols of the circle (O), the square [U], the triangle (A) and the cross (T).

History
Since 1999, OUAT Entertainment produces casual videogames on several platforms (Facebook, PC, OS X, iPhone, iPad, DS, PS2, Wii) in partnership with publishers (Ubisoft, Atari, Universal, Hasbro). Since 2009, OUAT creates and publishes its own casual and social games.

The company has specialized itself in the production of video games based on intellectual properties (Totally Spies, Kirikou, Les Incollables, Plus Belle La Vie). OUAT also creates its own IP (Intellectual Properties) such as Miss Teri Tale, Pure Hidden, Eden's Quest : The Hunt for Akua, or Kompany! and lastly Voyage to Fantasy.

Since 2016, Ouat Entertainment specialises itself in the production of mobile applications and mobile video games including Identity Pursuit and Word Heroes.

Developed games

References

Defunct video game companies of France
Video game companies established in 1999
Video game companies disestablished in 2019
Video game development companies
Companies based in Nouvelle-Aquitaine
French companies established in 1999
2019 disestablishments in France